The Little Presque Isle River is a  tributary of the Presque Isle River on the Upper Peninsula of Michigan, flowing to Lake Superior.

See also
List of rivers of Michigan

References

Michigan  Streamflow Data from the USGS

Rivers of Michigan
Rivers of Gogebic County, Michigan
Tributaries of Lake Superior